Interstate 40 (I-40) is an Interstate Highway in Oklahoma that runs  across the state from Texas to Arkansas. West of Oklahoma City, it parallels and replaces old U.S. Highway 66 (US-66), and, east of Oklahoma City, it parallels US-62, US-266, and US-64. I-40 is the longest Interstate highway in Oklahoma.

Cities along the route include Erick, Sayre, Elk City, Clinton, Weatherford, Oklahoma City and its suburbs (El Reno, Yukon, Del City, and Midwest City), Shawnee, Okemah, Henryetta, Checotah, and Sallisaw.

Route description

I-40 enters Oklahoma near Texola in Beckham County. It crosses the North Fork of the Red River near Sayre and runs through southern Elk City. It then cuts across northwest Washita County before entering Custer County. There, it passes through Clinton and Weatherford. After leaving Weatherford, I-40 then runs across northern Caddo County. After that, it enters the Oklahoma City metropolitan area at Canadian County.

I-40 runs through the southside of El Reno as it enters the Oklahoma City metropolitan area. It then passes through Yukon before entering Oklahoma City city limits. In west Oklahoma City, I-40 has a junction with I-44. It then runs just south of downtown Oklahoma City on a new 10-lane section. I-40 then interlines with I-35 at the Dallas Junction complex. After the Dallas Junction, I-40 then passes through Del City and Midwest City on the Tinker Diagonal. This provides access to Tinker Air Force Base in east Oklahoma City.

In far eastern Oklahoma City, I-40 meets I-240 in a partial junction. Afterward, it passes through the northside of Shawnee. This marks the eastern end of the Oklahoma City metropolitan area. In Henryetta, I-40 serves as the northern terminus of the Indian Nation Turnpike. In McIntosh County, it crosses the northernmost arm of Lake Eufaula. Afterward, it meets US-69 south of Checotah.

Near Webbers Falls, I-40 is the southern terminus of the Muskogee Turnpike. It then crosses the Arkansas River before passing through southern Sallisaw. The Interstate crosses into Arkansas north of Moffett.

History

West of Oklahoma City, I-40 parallels and replaces Old US-66. US-66 was decommissioned in Oklahoma in 1985.

Bridge collapse

The I-40 bridge over the McClellan–Kerr Arkansas River Navigation System near Webbers Falls was struck by a barge on May 26, 2002, causing the bridge to collapse and resulting in the death of 14 people.

Westbound I-40 traffic was detoured through Gore and Webbers Falls along SH-10, US-64, and SH-100, while eastbound traffic was diverted through Porum and Stigler along SH-2, SH-9, and US-59. Delays of 30 to 50 minutes on the  westbound detour were typical, although trains passing through Gore could lengthen wait times by 15 minutes. The eastbound detour added  and two hours to the typical trip. Some travelers chose to avoid the area entirely; one Tulsa trucking firm detoured trucks via Springdale, adding  to the trip.

The detour significantly impacted the town of Gore. Local firefighters directed traffic there 24 hours a day, with daytime temperatures approaching . Businesses in Gore reported loss of revenue due to the traffic; one gas station reported a 30% decline in revenue while traffic was detoured through town.

2013 tornado

On the evening of May 31, 2013, a very large and powerful multiple-vortex tornado occurred over rural areas of central Oklahoma, passing around El Reno, Oklahoma. Four of those fatalities were storm chasers, the first known deaths in storm chasing history. This tornado crossed over I-40 at around 6:33 pm CDT after hitting peak strength and maximum width and did a 270-degree counterclockwise loop north of the Interstate, clipping SH-66 before traveling on and along the Interstate, approaching Oklahoma City at a very slow speed. The tornado dissipated at 6:43 pm near exit 130 (Banner Road).

2015 shootings
On December 17, 2015, a Pasadena, Texas, man allegedly shot and killed two people on I-40 near Weatherford, Oklahoma. He was arrested by police in Clinton, Oklahoma.

Oklahoma City Crosstown realignment

The original I-40 Oklahoma City Crosstown Expressway was built in 1966 mostly as an elevated route; however, this former stretch was too narrow for existing traffic and was frequently in disrepair. In response, the I-40 Crosstown Expressway has been relocated a few blocks south of the original route and the original bridge torn down. The project was completed in February 2012.

The new I-40 Crosstown Expressway has been designed to carry more than 170,000 vehicles per day traveling at  using at least 10 lanes for traffic and has breakdown lanes for disabled vehicles and future lane expansion.

When the new crosstown opened in 2012, nearly 95% of non–rush hour traffic was considered 'through traffic' (i.e., not transferring to or from downtown streets).

A landscaped boulevard (Oklahoma City Boulevard) was completed in 2019, replacing the original I-40 Crosstown Bridge right-of-way through downtown Oklahoma City, similar to the I-30 reconstruction through downtown Fort Worth, Texas.

Business routes and old alignments

I-40 has eight business routes in Oklahoma, six of which are old alignments of US-66. A number of other old alignments of US-66 are also present west of Oklahoma City.

 I-40 Bus.
 I-40 Bus. It runs for  through Elk City, rejoining I-40 at exit 41.
 I-40 Bus. (formerly US-66) in Clinton is a business loop that begins at exit 65, runs  through Clinton, and rejoins I-40 at exit 69.
 I-40 Bus. (formerly US-66) in Weatherford is a business loop that exits I-40 at exit 82B, runs  through Weatherford, and rejoins I-40 at exit 82.
 I-40 Bus. (formerly US-66) in El Reno is a business loop that exits I-40 at exit 119, runs  through El Reno, and rejoins I-40 at exit 125, the interchange with US-81.
 I-40 Bus. (formerly US-62/US-75) in Henryetta is a business loop that leaves I-40 at exit 237, runs  through Henryetta, and rejoins I-40 at exit 240, the interchange with US-75 and the Indian Nation Turnpike.
 I-40 Bus. in Sallisaw is a business loop that leaves I-40 at exit 308 (US-59) runs  through Sallisaw, and rejoins I-40 at exit 311, US-64.

Exit list

Auxiliary route
I-40 has one auxiliary route in Oklahoma:
: A bypass of the southside of Oklahoma City

See also
U.S. Route 66 in Oklahoma

References

External links

I-40 at OKHighways.com
I-40 at AARoads

40
 Oklahoma
Transportation in Beckham County, Oklahoma
Transportation in Washita County, Oklahoma
Transportation in Custer County, Oklahoma
Transportation in Caddo County, Oklahoma
Transportation in Canadian County, Oklahoma
Transportation in Oklahoma County, Oklahoma
Transportation in Pottawatomie County, Oklahoma
Transportation in Seminole County, Oklahoma
Transportation in Okfuskee County, Oklahoma
Transportation in Okmulgee County, Oklahoma
Transportation in McIntosh County, Oklahoma
Transportation in Muskogee County, Oklahoma
Transportation in Sequoyah County, Oklahoma